Matthew S. Blumenthal (born January 30, 1986) is an American politician and attorney serving as a member of the Connecticut House of Representatives from the 147th district in Fairfield County.

Early life and education 
Blumenthal was born in Stamford and raised in nearby Greenwich. He is the eldest son of United States Senator Richard Blumenthal. He graduated from Harvard College and Yale Law School.

Career 
He practices law for the firm Koskoff Koskoff & Bieder and is a member of the United States Marine Corps Reserve. He served a tour of duty in Afghanistan as a part of Operation Enduring Freedom.

In 2018, Blumenthal was elected in the general election on November 6, winning 59 percent of the vote over 41 percent of Republican candidate Anzelmo Graziosi, a Democrat who switched parties after Blumenthal announced his candidacy and succeeding William Tong, who vacated the seat for his successful Attorney General campaign.

In 2020, Blumenthal was re-elected, defeating Dan Maymin 62 percent to 38 percent.

Two years later, he cosponsored House Bill 5414, along with Rep. Jillian Gilchrest, with whom he had cofounded the General Assembly's Reproductive Freedom Caucus that year. The bill, signed into law by Governor Ned Lamont shortly after passage as the  Reproductive Freedom Defense Act, was a response to the Texas Heartbeat Act and similar legislation passed in other states to restrict abortion access in anticipation of the Supreme Court's Dobbs v. Jackson Women's Health Organization decision, which overruled Roe v. Wade, and held that there is no constitutional right to abortion, allowing states to ban it outright, as several did in its immediate aftermath. It allows those who provide or facilitate the provision of abortions in Connecticut and are sued under laws like that in Texas to countersue in Connecticut for equivalent damages, prevents the state and its courts from assisting in the investigation or prosecutions of any abortions in other states that would be legal in Connecticut, or extraditing Connecticut residents charged in other states for such acts. It also expands abortion services available in Connecticut by allowing certain non-physicians to perform suction and medication abortions.

References

Blumenthal, Matt
Living people
21st-century American politicians
American people of German-Jewish descent
Jewish American state legislators in Connecticut
1986 births
Harvard College alumni
Wien family
Yale Law School alumni
Connecticut lawyers
Politicians from Stamford, Connecticut
People from Greenwich, Connecticut
United States Marine Corps reservists
21st-century American Jews